Glyphodes conjunctalis is a moth in the family Crambidae. It was described by Francis Walker in 1866. It is found on the Sula Islands, Misool, New Guinea, Seram, Ambon Island and Australia (Queensland).

The wingspan is about 20 mm. The wings are black with white patches.

References

Moths described in 1866
Glyphodes